Raukumara Conservation Park or Raukūmara Conservation Park is a protected area in the Gisborne District of New Zealand's North Island.

The park is managed by the New Zealand Department of Conservation.

Geography

History

The park was established in 1979.

References

Forest parks of New Zealand
Protected areas of the Gisborne District
Gisborne District
1979 establishments in New Zealand
Protected areas established in 1979